Ung is a surname.

Origin
Ung is a Latin-alphabet spelling of two Cambodian surnames, given below in Geographic Department romanization:
Oeng, which can be found among Chinese Cambodians as a Khmer-alphabet transcription of the Amoy Hokkien pronunciation of the Chinese surname Huáng.
Ung

It is the Sino-Korean reading of the Chinese surname Xióng, though that surname is not found modern South Korea. It is also a Scandinavian surname literally meaning "young".

Statistics
According to the 2010 United States Census, roughly 4,519 people in the United States bore the surname Ung, with most (91.79%) being Asian Pacific Americans. As of 2017, 16 people in Denmark and 26 people in Norway bore the surname Ung.

People
 Per Ung (1933–2013), Norwegian sculptor
 Chinary Ung (born 1942), Cambodian composer
 Ung Huot (born 1947), Prime Minister of Cambodia (1997–1998)
 Ung Hong Sath, Cambodian cabinet minister
 Loung Ung (born 1970), Cambodian-born American human-rights activist and lecturer
 Sandra Ung (born 1974), Cambodian-born American politician
 Daniel Ung (born 1975), Swedish football defender

References

Khmer-language names
Surnames from nicknames